This is a list of animated feature films scheduled for release in 2023.

Highest-grossing animated films
The following is a list of the 10 highest-grossing animated feature films first released in 2023.

References

2023
 Feature films
Lists of 2023 films